Infection (Infekcija) is a 2003 Croatian film directed by Krsto Papić. It has been described as both a sequel and a remake of The Rat Savior, Papić's 1976 film.

Cast
Leon Lučev – Ivan Gajski
Lucija Šerbedžija – Sara
Sven Medvešek – Professor Bošković
Filip Šovagović – The Mayor
Dražen Kühn – The Director
Ivo Gregurević – Muller
Božidar Alić – General Genz
Vili Matula – Karlo
Dejan Aćimović – Master of Ceremony
Boris Miholjević – The Inspector
Ana Karić – Mrs. Rudolph
Slavko Juraga
Vanja Drach
Nada Gačešić

References

External links
 

2003 films
Croatian crime drama films
2000s Croatian-language films
Films directed by Krsto Papić